Panther Creek is a stream in Bates and Henry counties of west central Missouri. It is a tributary of Osage River.

Panther Creek was named for the animal.

See also
List of rivers of Missouri

References

Rivers of Bates County, Missouri
Rivers of Henry County, Missouri
Rivers of Missouri